Jan Górny (17 January 1933 – 13 July 2018) was a Polish field hockey player. He competed in the men's tournament at the 1960 Summer Olympics.

References

External links
 

1933 births
2018 deaths
Polish male field hockey players
Olympic field hockey players of Poland
Field hockey players at the 1960 Summer Olympics
People from Gniezno
Sportspeople from Greater Poland Voivodeship